Justina Wilhelm is an American academic administrator, community leader, and social worker who has served as president since 2020 of Iḷisaġvik College, located in Utqiaġvik, Alaska and the only tribal college in the state. She had previously served as a member of the North Slope Borough School District's advisor council and the Utqiaġvik City Council. Earlier she helped direct behavioral health at the jurisdiction's health department.

Education 
Wilhelm was born to Rosanna Lemen. Since the age of 8, she was raised by her mother in Utqiaġvik, Alaska (formerly Barrow). Wilhelm graduated from Barrow High School. 

She earned a bachelor's degree in sociology from University of Hawaiʻi at Hilo. After returning for graduate studies, she earned a Master of Social Work from University of New England in 2018. Wilhelm is the first in her family to have graduated from college.

Career 
After college, Wilhelm returned to Utqiaġvik to work. She served 14 years as a social worker at the North Slope Health Department, and was deputy director of behavioral health for seven of those years. 

In 2017, Wilhelm joined Iḷisaġvik College as executive director of institutional advancement. She was promoted to dean of institutional advancement and then vice president. In 2020, Wilhelm was named by the North Slope Borough as the next president of the institution, succeeding Pearl Kiyawn Nageak Brower. She became president on October 1, 2020.

Wihelm has also been an active community leader. She served on the North Slope Borough School District's advisor council, the North Slope Borough Personnel Hearing Board, Arctic Women in Crisis Board, Eben Hopson Memorial Scholarship Committee, and the Utqiaġvik City Council.

Personal life 
Wihelm is an imiun, and the wife of whaling captain Ross Makalik Wilhelm. They have four children together. Since 2007, she has served on his crew.

References 

Living people
Year of birth missing (living people)
Place of birth missing (living people)
People from Utqiagvik, Alaska
Presidents of Iḷisaġvik College
University of Hawaiʻi at Hilo alumni
University of New England (United States) alumni
American social workers
American university and college faculty deans
Women heads of universities and colleges